John Powers (30 September 1868 – 9 November 1939) was an English cricketer. Powers was a right-handed batsman. He was born at Barwell, Leicestershire.

Powers made his first-class debut for Leicestershire against Surrey at Grace Road in the 1895 County Championship. He made eight further first-class appearances for the county, the last of which came against Warwickshire in the 1896 County Championship. In his nine first-class matches for Leicestershire, he scored a total of 195 runs at an average of 12.18, with a high score of 25.

He died at Leicester Forest East, Leicestershire on 9 November 1939.

References

External links
John Powers at Cricinfo
John Powers at CricketArchive

1868 births
1939 deaths
People from Barwell
Cricketers from Leicestershire
English cricketers
Leicestershire cricketers